Glenn Marcus Murcutt AO (born 25 July 1936) is an Australian architect and winner of the 1992 Alvar Aalto Medal, the 2002 Pritzker Architecture Prize, the 2009 American Institute of Architects Gold Medal and the 2021 Praemium Imperiale.  Glenn Murcutt works as a sole practitioner without staff, builds only within Australia and is known to be very selective with his projects. Being the only Australian winner of the prestigious Pritzker Prize, he is often referred to as Australia's most famous architect.

Life
Murcutt was born in London to Australian parents. He spent the first five years of his life in the Morobe Province of Papua New Guinea, where he first encountered vernacular architecture. After moving to Sydney with his parents in 1941, he was educated at Manly Boys' High School and studied architecture at the Sydney Technical College, from which he graduated in 1961. Murcutt's early work experience was with various architects, such as Neville Gruzman, Ken Woolley, Sydney Ancher and Bryce Mortlock, which exposed him to their style of organic architecture focussing on relationships to nature. By 1969, Murcutt established his own practice in the Sydney suburb of Mosman.

Murcutt works as a sole practitioner, producing residential and institutional work all over Australia. Although he does not work outside the country or run a large firm, his work has a worldwide influence, especially since Murcutt teaches master classes for beginning and established architects.

Murcutt's motto, 'touch the earth lightly', leads him to design his works to fit into the Australian landscape features. His works are highly economical and multi-functional. Murcutt also pays attention to aspects of the environment such as wind direction, water movement, temperature and light surrounding his sites before he designs the building itself. Materials such as glass, stone, timber, concrete, steel and corrugated iron are often included in his works.

Testament to his influence internationally was the award of the 2002 Pritzker Architecture Prize, one of the highest distinctions in architecture. In the words of the Pritzker jury: "In an age obsessed with celebrity, the glitz of our 'starchitects', backed by large staffs and copious public relations support, dominates the headlines. As a total contrast, Murcutt works in a one-person office on the other side of the world ... yet has a waiting list of clients, so intent is he to give each project his personal best. He is an innovative architectural technician who is capable of turning his sensitivity to the environment and to locality into forthright, totally honest, non-showy works of art."  In 2009 Murcutt won the American Institute of Architects Gold Medal.

Murcutt currently lectures and teaches architectural studies as a professor at the UNSW Faculty of Built Environment.

One of Murcutt's most recent projects is a mosque, the Australian Islamic Centre, in the Melbourne suburb of Newport.  In 2016, the mosque became the focus of a critically acclaimed documentary, “Glenn Murcutt: Spirit of Place”, by renowned filmmaker Catherine Hunter. The film documents the growing acceptance of Murcutt’s strikingly contemporary design, weaving into the narrative the stories of his famous domestic commissions, interviews with those involved, and an intimate biography of his life. Hunter has said about Murcutt: "He gives everything, he can’t help himself. He’s unstoppable, he’s this force. Long before we started talking about things such as sustainability, Glenn was practicing those things."

Glenn Murcutt's latest completed project is a new permanent sound installation space, the Cobar Sound Chapel in Cobar NSW, together with composer Georges Lentz. It was officially opened on April 2, 2022.

A portrait of Murcutt by Fiona Lowry was a finalist in the 2022 Archibald Prize.

Murcutt's son Nicholas (1964–2011) was also a practicing architect.

Building projects

 1972–74 : Laurie Short House, Sydney (NSW)
 1974–75 : Marie Short House, Kempsey (NSW)
 1976–83 : Berowra Waters Inn, Berowra Waters (NSW)
 1977–78: Ockens House, Cromer (NSW)
 1977–80 : Nicholas House, Mount Irvine (NSW)
 1977–80 : Carruthers House, Mount Irvine (NSW)
 1982    : Kempsey Visitor Information Centre (NSW)
 1981–83 : Ball-Eastaway House, Glenorie (NSW)
 1976–88 : Museum of Local History and Tourist Office, Kempsey (NSW)
 1981–82 : Fredericks House, Jamberoo (NSW)
 1982–84 : Magney House, Bingie Bingie (NSW)
 1986–90 : Magney House, Sydney (NSW)
 1988–91 : Done House, Sydney (NSW)
 1988–92 : Meagher House, Bowral (NSW)
 1992    : Raheen (Pratt Family Wing Addition), Kew (VIC)
 1989–94 : Simpson-Lee House, Mount Wilson (NSW)
 1991–94 : Marika-Alderton House, Yirrkala Community, Eastern Arnhem Land (NT)
 1992    : Murcutt Guest Studio, Kempsey (NSW)
 1992–94 : Bowali Visitor Information Centre, Kakadu National Park (NT), in collaboration with Troppo Architects
 1994–96 : Schnaxl House, Newport (NSW)
 1996–98 : Fletcher-Page House, Kangaroo Valley (NSW)
 1995–96 : Douglas and Ruth Murcutt House, Woodside (SA)
 1996–99 : Arthur and Yvonne Boyd Art Centre, Riversdale, West Cambewarra (NSW), in collaboration with Reg Lark and Wendy Lewin
 1997–2001 : House at Kangaloon (NSW)
 2000–03 : Murcutt/Lewin House and Studio, Mosman (NSW) in collaboration with Wendy Lewin
 2001–05 : Walsh House, Kangaroo Valley (NSW)
 2002–03 : Lerida Estate Winery, Lake George (NSW)
 2006–07 : Moss Vale Education Centre (University of Wollongong), Moss Vale (NSW), in collaboration with Wendy Lewin
 2006–16 : Australian Islamic Centre, Newport (VIC)
 2019: MPavilion, Melbourne
 2016–2022: Cobar Sound Chapel, Cobar (NSW)

Honours and awards
Prestigious awards include:
 the RAIA Gold Medal of the Royal Australian Institute of Architects in 1992
 the Alvar Aalto Medal in 1992
 Officer of the Order of Australia in 1996
 the Richard Neutra Award for Teaching in 1998
 the 'Green Pin' Award from the Royal Danish Academy of Architects in 1999
 the Thomas Jefferson Medal for Architecture in 2001
 the Pritzker Architecture Prize in 2002
 the Kenneth F. Brown Asia Pacific Culture and Architecture Award in 2003
 the AIA Gold Medal Award in 2009.
 the Praemium Imperiale in 2021.

He is an Honorary Fellow of the American Institute of Architects (AIA), an International Fellow of the Royal Institute of British Architects (RIBA), an Honorary Fellow of the Royal Architectural Institute of Canada, an Honorary Fellow of the Finnish Association of Architects as well as Honorary Member of the Architects Institutes in Taiwan, Scotland and Singapore. In 2008 he was elected an Honorary Member of the American Academy of Arts and Letters. In 2010, he was named a Senior Fellow of the Design Futures Council. He was founding President of the Australian Architecture Association and is Chair of the Architecture Foundation Australia (annual Murcutt International Master Class).

Bibliography
 "Glenn Murcutt Pritzker Prize", ArchitectureWeek No. 94, 2002.0417, pN1.1.
 Beck, Haig and Cooper, Jackie, A Singular Practice. Images, April 2006. .
 Carter, Nanette "Locating Design: A Site Every Design Professional Should See: The Marika-Alderton House, Yirrkala" Design and Culture, Vol. 3, No. 3, (Nov. 2011), pp. 375–378.  
Fromonot, Francoise. Glenn Murcutt : Buildings and Projects 1962–2003. Thames and Hudson, London/New York, 2005. . 
 Drew, Philip. Leaves of Iron : Glenn Murcutt : Pioneer of an Australian Architectural Form. .
 Drew, Philip. Touch This Earth Lightly: Glenn Murcutt in His Own Words. Duffy & Snellgrove, 15 May 2000. .
 Farrelly, Elizabeth Glenn Murcutt – Three Houses (Architecture in Detail). Phaidon Press Inc. (October 1993). .
 Gusheh, Heneghan, Lassan, Seyama, "The Architecture of Glenn Murcutt", TOTO, Japan, 2008. 
 Gusheh, Heneghan, Lassan, Seyama, "Glenn Murcutt – Thinking Drawing, Working Drawing", TOTO, Japan, 2008. 
 Limited Edition Folio, "Glenn Murcutt Architect", Essays by Kenneth Frampton, Juhani Pallasmaa, boxed photos/drawings. 01 Editions, Sydney, 2006. .
 Muller, Brook "In the Landscape of Murcutt", ArchitectureWeek No. 66, 2001.0912, pE1.1.
 Sharp, Dennis. The Illustrated Encyclopedia of Architects and Architecture. New York: Quatro Publishing, 1991. . NA40.I45. p111.

References

External links
 Architecture Foundation Australia Glenn Murcutt Master Class and Portfolio of Murcutt Projects
 Four-minute video clip Glenn Murcutt leading the annual Murcutt International Master Class
 Arthur and Yvonne Boyd Education Centre
 Public talk with Glenn Murcutt
 Location of Glenn Murcutt Buildings on checkonsite  Location of Glenn Murcutt Buildings

1936 births
Living people
New South Wales architects
Pritzker Architecture Prize winners
Architects from Sydney
University of New South Wales alumni
Officers of the Order of Australia
People educated at Manly Selective Campus
Recipients of the Royal Australian Institute of Architects’ Gold Medal
Architecture educators
Recipients of the AIA Gold Medal